The 1921 California Golden Bears football team, also known as the Wonder Team, was an American football team that represented the University of California, Berkeley in the Pacific Coast Conference (PCC) during the 1921 college football season. In their sixth year under head coach Andy Smith, the team compiled a 9–0–1 record (4–0 against PCC opponents), won the PCC championship, and outscored its opponents by a combined total of 312 to 33. In the postseason, the Golden Bears played a scoreless tie against Washington & Jefferson in the rain-soaked 1922 Rose Bowl. 

There was no contemporaneous system in 1921 for determining a national champion. However, California was retroactively named as the national champion for 1921 by the Billingsley Report (using its alternative "margin of victory" methodology), College Football Researchers Association, and Jeff Sagarin, and as a co-national champion under the Boand System.

Two California players, end Harold "Brick" Miller and tackle Dan McMillan, were consensus first-team picks on the 1921 All-America college football team. 

Additionally, California took eight of eleven first-team spots on the United Press' 1921 All-Pacific Coast football team: quarterback Charles F. Erb; halfback Crip Toomey; fullback Archie Nisbet; ends Robert E. Berkey and Howard Stephens; tackle Dan McMillan; and guards Webster V. Clark and Lee D. Cramer.

Schedule

References

California
California Golden Bears football seasons
College football national champions
Pac-12 Conference football champion seasons
College football undefeated seasons
California Golden Bears football